Maʿlamāt al-Maghrib is an encyclopedia of Morocco produced by the Moroccan Association for Composition, Translation, and Publication and published in 1989 by Salé Press. Its completion was overseen by the historian Muhammad Hajji. It was edited by Mohamed Hajji and Ahmed Toufiq.

Contributors in the human sciences included , Mohammed Zniber, and Mustafa Na'mi.

References 

Encyclopedias
1989 books
History books about Morocco
Arabic literature
Arabic-language encyclopedias